Kukra Hill is a municipality in the South Caribbean Coast Autonomous Region of Nicaragua.

The nearest airfield is Bluefields Airport.

Municipalities of the South Caribbean Coast Autonomous Region